Georg Friedrich Julius Arthur von Auwers (12 September 1838 – 24 January 1915) was a German astronomer. Auwers was born in Göttingen to Gottfried Daniel Auwers and Emma Christiane Sophie (née Borkenstein).

He attended the University of Göttingen and worked at the University of Königsberg. He specialized in astrometry, making very precise measurements of stellar positions and motions. He detected the companion stars of Sirius and Procyon from their effects on the main star's motion, before telescopes were powerful enough to visually observe them. He was from 1866 Secretary to the Berlin Academy, and directed expeditions to measure the transits of Venus, in order to measure the distance from the earth to the Sun more accurately, and therefore be able to calculate the dimensions of the Solar System more accurately and with greater precision. He began a project to unify all available sky charts, an interest that began with his catalog of nebulae which he published in 1862. He died in Berlin. His grave is preserved in the Protestant Friedhof I der Jerusalems- und Neuen Kirchengemeinde (Cemetery No. I of the congregations of Jerusalem's Church and New Church) in Berlin-Kreuzberg, south of Hallesches Tor.

His son Karl von Auwers became a well known chemist and discoverer of the Auwers synthesis.

Honors
Awards
 Foreign Honorary Member of the American Academy of Arts and Sciences, 1880
 Gold Medal of the Royal Astronomical Society, 1888
 James Craig Watson Medal, 1891
 Pour le Mérite (civil class), 31 May 1892
 Bruce Medal, 1899
 The crater Auwers on the Moon is named after him

References

External links

 Bruce Medal page
 Awarding of Bruce Medal
 Awarding of RAS Gold Medal

Obituaries
 AN 200 (1915) 185/186 (in German)
 MNRAS 76 (1916) 284
 Obs 38 (1915) 177

Further reading
 

1838 births
1915 deaths
19th-century German astronomers
Scientists from Göttingen
People from the Kingdom of Hanover
Academic staff of the University of Königsberg
University of Göttingen alumni
Recipients of the Gold Medal of the Royal Astronomical Society
Recipients of the Bruce Medal
Foreign Members of the Royal Society
Foreign associates of the National Academy of Sciences
Members of the Prussian Academy of Sciences
Honorary Fellows of the Royal Society of Edinburgh
Fellows of the American Academy of Arts and Sciences
Corresponding members of the Saint Petersburg Academy of Sciences
Honorary members of the Saint Petersburg Academy of Sciences
Recipients of the Pour le Mérite (civil class)
Members of the Austrian Academy of Sciences
Members of the Göttingen Academy of Sciences and Humanities